Charles Bruce Catton (October 9, 1899 – August 28, 1978) was an American historian and journalist, known best for his books concerning the American Civil War. Known as a narrative historian, Catton specialized in popular history, featuring interesting characters and historical vignettes, in addition to the basic facts, dates, and analyses. His books were researched well and included footnotes. He won a Pulitzer Prize during 1954 for A Stillness at Appomattox, his study of the final campaign of the war in Virginia.

Early life

Charles Bruce Catton was born in Petoskey, Michigan, to George R. and Adela M. (Patten) Catton, and raised in Benzonia, Michigan. His father was a Congregationalist minister, who accepted a teaching position in Benzonia Academy and later became the academy's headmaster. As a boy, Catton first heard the reminiscences of the aged veterans who had fought in the Civil War. In his memoir, Waiting for the Morning Train (1972), Catton explained how their stories made a lasting impression upon him:
 During 1916, Catton began attending Oberlin College, but he quit without completing a degree because of World War I.

Journalism career

After serving briefly with the United States Navy during World War I, Catton became a reporter and editor for the newspapers The Cleveland News (as a freelance reporter), the Boston American (1920–1924), and the Cleveland The Plain Dealer (1925). From 1926 to 1941, he worked for the Newspaper Enterprise Association, a Scripps-Howard syndicate), for which he wrote editorials and book reviews, as well as serving as a Washington, D.C. correspondent. Catton tried twice to complete his studies, but found himself repeatedly distracted by his newspaper work. Oberlin College awarded him an honorary degree in 1956.

Writing career

At the start of World War II, Catton was too old for military service. During 1941, he accepted a position as Director of Information for the War Production Board, and later he had similar jobs in the Department of Commerce and the Department of the Interior. His experiences as a federal employee prepared him to write his first book, The War Lords Of Washington, during 1948. Although the book was not a commercial success, it inspired Catton to quit federal employment to become a full-time author.

In 1954, Catton accepted the position as founding editor of the new magazine American Heritage. Catton served initially as a writer, reviewer, and editor. In the first issue, he wrote:

Army of the Potomac trilogy

In the early 1950s, Catton published three books known collectively as the Army of the Potomac trilogy, a history of that army. For Mr. Lincoln's Army (1951), the first volume, Catton recounted the army's formation, the command of George B. McClellan, the Peninsula Campaign, the Northern Virginia Campaign, and the Battle of Antietam. For the second volume, Glory Road (1952), Catton recounted the army's history with new commanding generals, from the Battle of Fredericksburg to the Battle of Gettysburg. For his final volume of the trilogy, A Stillness at Appomattox (1953), Catton recounted the campaigns of Ulysses S. Grant in Virginia from 1864 to the end of the war during 1865. It was his first commercially successful work and it won both the Pulitzer Prize for History and a National Book Award for Nonfiction. The three volumes were reissued in 1984 as a single volume reprint, titled Bruce Catton's Civil War.

Centennial History of the Civil War

From 1961 to 1965, the Centennial of the Civil War was commemorated, and Catton published his Centennial History of the Civil War trilogy. Unlike his previous trilogy, these books emphasized not only military topics, but social, economic, and political topics as well. For the first volume, The Coming Fury (1961), Catton discussed the causes of the war, culminating in its first major combat operation, the First Battle of Bull Run. For the second volume, Terrible Swift Sword (1963), he discussed both sides as they mobilize for a massive war effort. The story continued through 1862, ending with McClellan's dismissal after the Battle of Antietam. For the third volume, Never Call Retreat (1965), the war continued through the battles of Vicksburg and Gettysburg, and the bloody struggles of 1864 and 1865 before the final surrender.

Ulysses S. Grant trilogy

After the publication of Captain Sam Grant (1950) by historian and biographer Lloyd Lewis, Catton wrote the second and third volumes of this trilogy, making extensive use of Lewis's historical research, provided by his widow, Kathryn Lewis, who personally selected Catton to continue her husband's work. In Grant Moves South (1960), Catton discussed the increasing experience of Grant as a military commander, from victories at the Battle of Fort Henry and the Battle of Fort Donelson, to the Battle of Shiloh and the Vicksburg Campaign. In Grant Takes Command (1969), Catton discussed Grant's career from the Battle of Chattanooga (1863) through the 1864 Virginia campaigns against Robert E. Lee and the end of the war.

Other Civil War books

In addition to these three important trilogies, Catton wrote extensively about the Civil War throughout his career. In U. S. Grant and the American Military Tradition (1954), Catton writes what many consider one of the best short biographies of the general. In Banners at Shenandoah: A Story of Sheridan's Fighting Cavalry (1955), Catton wrote for young people about Union cavalry commander Philip Sheridan in the Shenandoah Valley during 1864. This Hallowed Ground (1956) was an account of the war from the Union perspective. Upon its publication, it was widely considered the best single volume history of the Civil War, receiving a Fletcher Pratt Award from the Civil War Round Table of New York during 1957.

In America Goes to War (1958), Catton made the case that the American Civil War was one of the first total wars. In The American Heritage Picture History of the Civil War (1960), Catton wrote the accompanying narrative to a book that included more than 800 paintings and period photographs. It received a special Pulitzer Prize citation during 1961. In The American Heritage Short History of the Civil War (1960), Catton offers a narrative that discussed the military and political aspects of the war. In Two Roads to Sumter (1963), written with his son William, Catton recounted the 15 years prior to the war, as considered from the points of view of the two main politicians involved in the conflict: Abraham Lincoln and Jefferson Davis. In Gettysburg: The Final Fury (1974), Catton offered a slim volume concerning the Battle of Gettysburg, dominated by photographs and illustrations.

Other books

In addition to Civil War histories, Catton published other books, including The War Lords Of Washington (1948), an account of Washington, D.C., during World War II, based on his experiences in the federal government, Four Days: The Historical Record Of The Death Of President Kennedy (1964), a 144-page collaboration of the American Heritage magazine and United Press International on the John F. Kennedy assassination, and Waiting for the Morning Train (1972), about the author's Michigan boyhood. Toward the end of his life, Catton published Michigan: A Bicentennial History (1976) and The Bold & Magnificent Dream: America's Founding Years, 1492–1815 (1978).

Poetry
Names from the War (1960), a long poem, was published in 1960. It was set to music by Alex Wilder.

Reception 
In a review of Catton's memoir, Waiting for the Morning Train, New York Times writer Webster Schott wrote, looking back over Catton's career, that "As much as anyone who has ever written about the Civil War, Bruce Catton made it real. Catton not only told us how and why it happened, he made us feel it. He brought to his writing an extraordinary combination of scholarship, literary skill and intimate concern."

Oliver Jensen, who succeeded Catton as editor of American Heritage, wrote that "No one ever wrote American history with more easy grace, beauty and emotional power, or greater understanding of its meaning, than Bruce Catton... There is a near-magic power of imagination in Catton’s work [that] almost seemed to project him physically onto the battlefields, along the dusty roads and to the campfires of another age."

American writer Gore Vidal criticized Catton for a hagiographic approach to writing about prominent Americans of the past, calling him "that ubiquitous clone of Parson Weems." Vidal groups Catton with American historians who "never accept as a fact anything that might obscure those figures illuminated by the high noon of Demos...." As an example, he cites Catton's dismissal of stories related to Grant's alcohol consumption during the Civil War and places Catton "in Parson Weems land where all our presidents were good and some were great and none ever served out his term without visibly growing in office."

Personal life

On August 16, 1925, Catton married Hazel H. Cherry. During 1926, they had a son, William Bruce Catton, who taught history at Princeton University and at Middlebury College, Vermont, where he was the first Charles A. Dana Professor of History.

Death and legacy

Bruce Catton died in a hospital near his summer home at Frankfort, Michigan, after a respiratory illness. He was buried in Benzonia Township Cemetery in Benzie County, Michigan.

During 1977, the year before his death, Catton received the Presidential Medal of Freedom, the nation's greatest civilian honor, from President Gerald R. Ford, who noted that the author and historian "made us hear the sounds of battle and cherish peace."

Of the many Civil War historians, Catton was arguably the most prolific and popular. Oliver Jensen, who succeeded him as editor of the magazine American Heritage, wrote:

The Bruce Catton Collection is housed in the Archives of The Citadel, the Military College of South Carolina.

The Civil War Documentary
Ken Burns's television documentary The Civil War was based partly on Bruce Catton's books, and resulted in a revival of interest in his histories.

Bruce Catton Prize
Since 1984, the Bruce Catton Prize was awarded for lifetime achievement in the writing of history. In cooperation with American Heritage Publishing Company, the Society of American Historians during 1984 initiated the biennial prize that honors an entire body of work. It is named for Bruce Catton, prizewinning historian and first editor of American Heritage magazine. The prize consisted of a certificate and $2,500.

The prize was awarded to Dumas Malone (1984), C. Vann Woodward (1986), Richard B. Morris (1988), Henry Steele Commager (1990), Edmund S. Morgan (1992), John Hope Franklin (1994), Arthur Schlesinger, Jr. (1996), Richard N. Current (1998), Bernard Bailyn (2000), Gerda Lerner (2002), David Brion Davis (2004), and David Herbert Donald (2006).

Works

Nonfiction

 The War Lords of Washington.  New York: Harcourt, Brace, & Co., 1948.
 U.S. Grant and the American Military Tradition. Boston: Little, Brown and Company, 1954.
 This Hallowed Ground. New York: Doubleday and Company, 1956.
 America Goes to War. Middletown: Wesleyan University Press, 1958.
 The American Heritage Picture History of the Civil War. New York: American Heritage Publishing, 1960.
 The American Heritage Short History of the Civil War. New York: American Heritage Publishing, 1960.
 Michigan's Past and the Nation's Future. Detroit: Wayne State University Press, 1960
 Four Days: The Historical Record Of The Death Of President Kennedy. New York: American Heritage Publishing, 1964.
 Prefaces to History. New York: Doubleday and Company, 1970
 Waiting for the Morning Train. New York: Doubleday and Company, 1972.
 Gettysburg: The Final Fury. New York: Doubleday and Company, 1974.
 Michigan: A Bicentennial History. New York: W. W. Norton & Company, 1976.
 Bruce Catton's America: Selections from His Greatest Works. New York: American Heritage, 1979
 Reflections on the Civil War. New York: Doubleday and Company, 1981
 Shiloh. Boston: New Word City, 2017.
 Missionary Ridge. Boston: New Word City, 2017.

Army of the Potomac trilogy

 Mr. Lincoln's Army. New York: Doubleday and Company, 1951.
 Glory Road. New York: Doubleday and Company, 1952.
 A Stillness at Appomattox. New York: Doubleday and Company, 1953.

Centennial History of the Civil War

 The Coming Fury. New York: Doubleday and Company, 1961.
 Terrible Swift Sword. New York: Doubleday and Company, 1963.
 Never Call Retreat. New York: Doubleday and Company, 1965.
 Reflections on the Civil War. New York: Doubleday & Company, 1981.

Ulysses S. Grant trilogy

 Grant Moves South. Boston: Little, Brown and Company, 1960.
 Grant Takes Command. Boston: Little, Brown and Company, 1969.

Note: These two volumes are sequels to historian Lloyd Lewis's posthumously published Captain Sam Grant (Boston: Little, Brown and Company, 1950.)

With William Catton

 Two Roads to Sumter. New York: McGraw-Hill, 1963.
 The Bold & Magnificent Dream: America's Founding Years, 1492–1815. New York: Doubleday and Company, 1978.

Fiction
 Banners at Shenandoah: A Story of Sheridan's Fighting Cavalry. New York: Doubleday and Company, 1955.

Biographical sketch and list of articles by Catton in American Heritage

Honors and awards
 1954 National Book Award for Nonfiction for A Stillness at Appomattox
 1954 Pulitzer Prize for History for A Stillness at Appomattox
 1959 Meritorious Service Award in the Field of Civil War History, presented by Harry S. Truman
 1977 Presidential Medal of Freedom, presented by Gerald R. Ford
 1956–1978 Catton received 26 honorary degrees from colleges and universities across the United States

References

External links
 Jensen, Oliver. "Working With Bruce Catton" in American Heritage, February/March 1979.
 Blight, David W. "Bruce Catton: Notes about the famous historian and American Heritage editor", in American Heritage, Spring, 2012.
 Miller, John J. "He Rewrote History" in Traverse, June 2009.
 Reynolds, Mark C. "Golden Anniversary" in American Heritage, November/December 2004.
 Cleveland Public Library
 National Book Foundation
 Cleveland Arts Prize
 

American newspaper journalists
1899 births
1978 deaths
Historians of the American Civil War
Historians from Michigan
National Book Award winners
Presidential Medal of Freedom recipients
Pulitzer Prize for History winners
United States Navy personnel of World War I
Oberlin College alumni
People from Benzie County, Michigan
People from Petoskey, Michigan
American Congregationalists
20th-century American male writers
20th-century American historians
20th-century American journalists
American male journalists
20th-century American non-fiction writers
American male non-fiction writers
Members of the American Academy of Arts and Letters